Shey Phoksundo National Park is the largest and only trans-Himalayan national park in Nepal.

The park's headquarters are in Palam, Dolpa District.

Geography
Shey Phoksundo National Park has a diversity of landscapes and ranks among the most scenic montane parks in the world. Near the lake’s outlet is the country’s highest waterfall.

The Langu river drains the high Dolpo plateau located in the north-east of the park. The Suligad and Jugdual rivers form the southern catchment flowing south into the Thuli Bheri River.

Climate

Spanning the northern and southern aspects of the Himalayan crest, the park experiences a wide climatic range and lies in the transition zone from a monsoon dominated to an arid climate. Most of the precipitation occurs during monsoon from July to September. The Dhaulagiri and Kanjiroba massifs form a massive barrier preventing most of the rain from reaching the Trans-Himalayan area. Winters are quite severe with frequent snowfalls above  and temperatures remaining below freezing above  through much of the winter.

Wildlife

Flora
The flora found within the park is extremely diverse. The northern regions contain barren areas of the upper Himalayas. The Trans-Himalayan slope lands consist of some rhododendron, caragana shrubs, salix, juniper, white Himalayan birch, and the occasional silver fir dominate the high meadows of the Himalayas. Less than five percent of the park is forested, with much of it lying in the southern portion. The Suligad Vally’s flora consists of blue pine, spruce, hemlock, cedar, silver fir, poplar, rhododendron, and bamboo. The park also contains 286 species of ethnobotanical importance.

Fauna
The park provides essential habitat for some endangered mammals, including the snow leopard, Himalayan wolf, Himalayan brown bear, white-bellied musk deer, and bharal. Among others, Himalayan goral, argali, Himalayan tahr, Indian leopard, golden jackal, Himalayan black bear and yellow-throated marten also inhabit this park. The park is also home to six reptiles and 29 species of butterflies, including one of the highest flying butterfly in the world, Pyrgus nepalensis. The park provides habitat for over 200 species of birds such as Tibetan partridge, wood snipe, white-throated bushtit, seven species of accentors, six species of rosefinches and golden eagle.

Culture
The park contains many gompas and religious sites, many of which have been renovated. Shey Gompa, the most famous, was established in the 11th century. Thashung Gompa located near Phoksundo Lake was built about 900 years ago to conserve wildlife. Ringmo village, a typical Tibetan village, is scenically nestled in the park.
The local people are subsistence farmers growing potatoes, buckwheat, mustard, beans and some barley; and keeping livestock for food and wool. They barter with Tibetans for salt and wool. Their lifestyle is typically Tibetan. Most of them are Buddhists; the people around Phoksundo area practice Bön. There are communal gompas in most of the villages.

References

External links

 Department of National Parks and Wildlife Conservation, Nepal : Shey-Phoksundo National Park

National parks of Nepal
1984 establishments in Nepal